Heinz Wemper (8 June 1903 – 15 May 1985) was a German actor. He appeared in 27 films between 1929 and 1943.

Selected filmography
 The Ship of Lost Souls (1929)
 Overnight Sensation (1932)
 Gold (1934)
 Police Report (1934)
 A Night on the Danube (1935)
 Black Roses (1935)
 Escapade (1936)
 The Czar's Courier (1936)
 Moscow-Shanghai (1936)
 The Man Who Was Sherlock Holmes (1937)
 The Ruler (1937)
 Sergeant Berry (1938)
 Dance on the Volcano (1938)
 Bravo Acrobat! (1943)

References

External links

1903 births
1985 deaths
German male film actors
20th-century German male actors
People from Hattingen